Ramgarhwa (commonly pronounced as Ramgarhwa) is a village in motihari district of Bihar state, India.
Ramgarhwa is a town in Motihari district in the state of Bihar, India.  And there is a very big market for business, situated at a distance of 20 kilometers from Ramgarhwa to the Nepal border.  This area is one of the least flood affected areas of Bihar.

Bihar